En herre med bart is a 1942 Norwegian comedy film directed by Alfred Maurstad, based on a play by Finn Bø, and starring Per Aabel and Wenche Foss. Attorney Ole Grong (Aabel) and his wife Cecilie (Foss) are having marital difficulties. After they decide on a divorce, they both go away to recuperate and, when they happen to check in at the same hotel, complications ensue.

External links
 
 

1944 films
Films directed by Alfred Maurstad
1944 comedy films
Norwegian comedy films
Norwegian black-and-white films
1940s Norwegian-language films